Catharine Margaret Mastin (born August 1, 1963) is a Canadian curator. She is a specialist in modern and contemporary art with an emphasis on gender and women’s art practices. She has worked at the Art Gallery of Windsor in Ontario and the Glenbow Museum in Calgary, Alberta. At the Art Gallery of Windsor, she was curator, arts administrator and executive director (2010-2020).

Early life and education 
Mastin grew up in Toronto and went to York University for both her Bachelor of Fine Arts and her master's degree in art history and architecture. In 2012, the University of Alberta awarded her a PhD in women’s history with the dissertation Beyond ‘the Artist’s Wife’: Women in Artist-Couple Marriage and the Exhibition Experience in Postwar Canada. Her doctoral writing was included in Mary Pratt (2013, 2nd edition 2016).

Mastin's grandfather is the artist Franklin Carmichael.

Career 

In her over 30-year curatorial career, Mastin has curated more than one hundred exhibitions. She was hired in 1988 as curator of Canadian Art at the Art Gallery of Windsor. In 1992, organized an exhibition and participated in the writing of the multi-author book, ‘The Talented Intruder’: Wyndham Lewis in Canada, 1939-1945, which was praised by English reviewers as making progress in understanding Lewis's Canadian years.

From 1995 until 2006, needing a broader field of vision, she worked at the Glenbow Museum, Calgary as senior art curator and twice interim vice-president (exhibitions and collections). In 1996, she co-founded the Alberta Biennial of Contemporary Art which she co-curated in 1996 and 1998. She also curated exhibitions of Franklin Carmichael, including one for the National Gallery of Canada, Ottawa, (2001) which toured Canada through 2003, and the Art Gallery of Sudbury (2005). In 2002, she curated the major travelling exhibition, The Group of Seven in Western Canada, accompanied by the first comprehensive book on the subject which she edited and for which she wrote the introductory essay.

From 2010 till 2020, Mastin served as the sixth executive director of the Art Gallery of Windsor during which time she led the gallery through a significant organizational change process and its 75th anniversary. Under her leadership, the gallery earned an unprecedented 20 performance awards between 2013 and 2019 for tourism, partnerships, exhibitions, writing, staff excellence, volunteerism and community recognition. She launched the digitization initiative, the on-line collections exhibition publishing program, and oversaw three multi-year permanent collection exhibitions including the Art Gallery of Windsor collection at 75 Years (2018-2021) which strengthened the voices of indigenous artists and women with new acquisitions.

In Windsor, Ontario, her exhibition of photographer Brenda Francis Pelkey: A Retrospective toured Canada (2016-2018), along with the accompanying multi-authored monograph,  Territories: Brenda Francis Pelkey (2017). Critics considered both show and book thoughtful and definitive. She also has written numerous articles for catalogues such as ones on Frances Loring and Florence Wyle in Uninvited: Canadian Women Artists in the Modern Moment. In 2022, she wrote Marion Nicoll: Life and Work for the Art Canada Institute, available online.

Since 2014 she has served as an advisor for the Gail and Stephen Jarislowsky Institute for Canadian Art as well as serving on the jury for Canada’s national portrait competition, the Kingston Prize in 2017 and in 2019. In 2017, Mastin volunteered for five years of service on the board of directors of the Ontario Association of Art Galleries including a term as president (2017-2018). In 2022, she served as an Adjunct Member in the Faculty of Graduate Studies in Art History at York University, Toronto, Canada.

Honours and awards 
In 1993 and 1995 her writing projects on Wyndham Lewis and colonial narratives in public art collections earned her curatorial writing awards from the Ontario Association of Art Galleries. In 1998, she was a two-time nominee for Canada’s Top 40 under 40 Award for outstanding professionals in all sectors. Her book on The Group of Seven in Western Canada was the first multi-authored volume on an important Canadian art movement and the also the one of the first volumes on the Group of Seven to include female writers; it remained on the Canadian best-seller list through the summer of 2002 and was released in a second edition in 2007.

References

Bibliography 

1963 births
Living people
Canadian art curators
People from Toronto
York University alumni
University of Alberta alumni
Canadian art historians
Canadian women curators
Canadian feminists
women museum directors
Directors of museums in Canada
Canadian non-fiction writers
Canadian women non-fiction writers